Kíla is a 1987 Irish folk music/world music group from the Irish language secondary school, Coláiste Eóin in County Dublin.

Band History
Kíla began in 1987 in the secondary in Coláiste Eoin, in the first year they busked nearly every week and played 44 concerts, mostly at their father's publishing company book launches, their mother's art exhibition openings and their brother's political campaign launches. Their first pay-in concert was upstairs in the Baggot Inn and was attended by only 3 people one of which was the broadcaster Bláthnaid Ní Chofaigh and her school friend Nóra Ní Chonchubhair and the Music historian and musician but then didgeridoo player Siomon O Dwyer.

But Kíla's genesis goes much further back to the primary school Scoil Lorcáin where Rossa Ó Snodaigh, Colm Mac con Iomaire, Aengus Mac An Rí and Fearghal Mac Cárthaigh competed in competitions like Feis Átha Cliath, Feis Lorcáin and Feis Naithí as two pieces and three pieces. In 1984 at the start of his  second year in the secondary school of Coláiste Eoin Rossa asked fiddler Colm Mac Con Iomaire and flute player Aengus Mac An Rí if they wanted to form a band to enter competitions like Slógadh.

They asked their fellow primary schoolmate - whistler Fearghal Mac Cárthaigh, Colm's neighbour - piper Eoin Dillon and Rossa's brother - bodhrán player Rónán Ó Snodaigh to join them. They were initially guided by their whistle teacher Mícheál Ó hAlmhain and upon his departure by a past pupil come teacher Proinsias de Poire who named them 'Cogar' (whisper). They went busking, played lunchtime sessions , and entered competitions but never progressed to the national finals of Slógadh.

After the departure of Fearghal Mac Cárthaigh and Aengus Mac An Rí before the summer holidays of 1987, they regrouped upon their return in 5th year and invited a guitarist, Karl Odlum from their class to join them. A classmate and budding radio worker for Bray Local Broadcast offered them to come on a show that weekend and so they all drove up to Karl's house to rehearse whereupon Karl mentioned that his brother, Rónan's classmate Dave Odlum, would like to join and was a better guitarist and that he actually played the bass.
So they rehearsed 4 sets of tunes that morning and got a lift to the radio station where they performed for the very first time as the outfit that would become named Kíla. Within the year they were invited to play in the National Concert at a ceremony that the then President Dr. Ó hIrghile attended and at a festival in Bonn in Germany, where they were joined by Colm Ó Snodaigh.

The original lineup for the band was Eoin Dillon (uilleann pipes), Colm Mac Con Iomaire (fiddle), Rossa Ó Snodaigh (whistle, bones), Rónán Ó Snodaigh (bodhrán), Karl Odlum (bass), and David Odlum (guitar). In 1988 one of Rossa and Rónán's older brother's - flute player Colm Ó Snodaigh, joined the band before the first recordings were made. Rónán, Rossa, and Colm Ó Snodaigh are sons of publisher Pádraig Ó Snodaigh and artist Clíodna Cussen and are brothers of Irish TD, Aengus Ó Snodaigh.

In 1991, Colm Mac Con Iomaire and Dave Odlum left Kíla to join The Frames, an Irish rock band. In the same year, Dee Armstrong and Eoin O'Brien joined the band as replacements. Dave Reidy also joined as a lead guitarist, though he emigrated to San Francisco a year later. Karl was then replaced by Ed Kelly on bass who emigrated to Scotland a little over a year after the recording Mind the Gap in 1994. Eoin O'Brien was replaced by Lance Hogan. Laurence O Keefe filled in temporarily on bass until Brian Hogan assumed that position prior to recording Tóg É Go Bog É.

In 2003, in a review of their album Luna Park, Kíla's blend of Irish traditional music and world music with a modern rock sensibility was credited with breathing new life into contemporary Irish folk music.

In 2009, Donegal guitarist Seanan Brennan joined the band to replace Lance who was on a sabbatical. He has remained with the band since then bringing an electric guitar to the line up for the first time since Eoin O'Brien was a member. He made his first appearance with Kíla in early January of that year on a televised version of Leath ina Dhiaidh a hOcht.

In 2008, Kíla recorded "The Ballad of Ronnie Drew" with U2, Shane MacGowan, Glen Hansard, Damien Dempsey, The Dubliners and a host of other artists. With proceeds going to The Irish Cancer Society. The song was later included on a U2.com-only album of collaborations that U2 recorded with other artists - Duals (2012).

Kíla have played in 35 countries on all continents excepte South America and at some of the biggest festivals around the world, like  Montreaux Jazz Festival - Switzerland, Womad and Cambridge Folk Festivals - England, Rainforest World Music Festival in Borneo, Electric Picnic, Womadelaide, Glastonbury, and the Stockholm Water Festival, Sziget Festival- Budapest Hungary. They have also performed  at the launch of the Special Olympics in Ireland for the welcoming ceremony of the Dalai Llama and at many of President Mícheál Ó hUiginn's garden Parties.

In 2010, the band collaborated with French composer Bruno Coulais on the soundtrack of Cartoon Saloon'sThe Secret of Kells, The film was nominated for a best animated film at the 82nd Academy Awards in 2010. That same year their music was heavily featured in two other feature films - Maeve Murphy's controversial Beyond the Fire and Ciarán O'Connor's Trafficked. Kíla's music also features in the award-winning documentary film Fight or Flight.

In late 2011, Kíla published their long-awaited Book of Tunes. Comprising over 100 of their compositions and lavishly decorated with photos, poems & prose, the book was a huge success, being described as 'a masterpiece' by Seán Laffey from Irish Music Magazine. The publication of the book ended a fine year for Kíla in style. Through this year they played three sell-out shows in Harare, Zimbabwe at the HIAFA festival, played at the Possibilities conference that welcomed the Dalai Lama to Ireland and played the inaugural concert in Temple Bar Meeting House Square, under the elegant retractable canopies, two days before Christmas.

2015 could be termed the 'year of the awards and nominations' for Kíla. They collaborated on the music for the Oscar nominated animated feature, Song of the Sea with Bruno Coulais. They received an Annie Awards nomination for 'Outstanding Achievement in Music in an Animated Feature Production'. They also received an Emmy nomination for their work on a Crossing The Line production called 'The Secret Life of the Shannon'. In June Eoin Dillon left and James Mahon from Shankill took his place.

In 2020, just at the eve of the lockdowns, Kíla had begun recording music for two films Cartoon Saloon's Wolfwalkers, and Tomás Ó Súilleabháin debut film Arracht. Screen Ireland chose Arracht to represent Ireland in the foreign film category in the Oscars and Wolfwakers was entered by Apple for the best Animation. It could've been the case that Kíla would've been mentioned in two films in the running for Oscars, but alas Arracht didn't make the shortlist. The band did win an IFTA for their score for Arracht and were in the running along with Bruno for many other award ceremonies for Wolfwalkers.

During the two lockdowns, their manager Caoimhe Ní Riagáin organised six different online lockdown concerts culminating in a Wolfwalker's themed St Patrick's day broadcast going live to all the Irish consulates across the world. By 2021, she took a post in the Arts Council, and Rossa stepped into the role to organise their 15 date post lockdown tour and produce their 3 larger shows – Kíla & Tumble Circus Sept 2021, Kíla le Prás - New Year's Eve 2021, Kíla & Cairde for Tradfest in the National Stadium 2022.

Band members 
The present lineup of Kíla as of 2015 until Now is:
 Rossa Ó Snodaigh has performed and composed for many theatre and dance companies. He composed music for Jean Butler's Masterclass Dance DVD and in 2011 performed his compositions in the La Mama Theatre for Irish Modern Dance Theatre's piece Fall and Recover. He also gives numerous music and drumming workshops. He plays wind, skin and stringed instruments and sometimes during the one piece of music. He runs the Irish language tent at the Electric Picnic and founded a Gaelscoil (Irish-speaking national school) in his local area, Cluainín Uí Ruairc, Co. Liatroma. He has had seven books published thus far: The Joy of Pissing, Cliúsaíocht as Gaeilge/Making Out in Irish, Our Fada co-authored with Micheál Ó Domhnaill, An Fochlach Foclach and a children's books Aistir ar an Aibítir, Grá i nGléas G and Cad a Chuirfeadh Seon ar Leon?. He also set up the Speaker's Square and the Dublin Drum Circle in Dublin's Temple Bar. Upon moving to Liatroim he established and later chaired the founding committee to open Gaelscoil Chluainín and Aonad Loch Gile.  He also played the spoons in Hershey's Mousse North American advertising campaign in 1988.
 Rónán Ó Snodaigh continues to develop his varying bodhrán techniques. He toured with Dead Can Dance in the 1990s.  Since DCD's Spiritchaser tour in 1996, he has focused his energies on Kíla and his solo work. He has released seven solo albums to date Tiptoe, The Playdays, Tonnta Ró, The Last Mile Home, Water off a Duck's Back, Sos and Or agus Airgead. He has also released an album of soundtrack work Wild Journeys His latest book of poetry, The Garden Wars, was published in 2007. Rónán has composed original score for a number of nature series including Wild Journey's, The Eagles Return and The Secret life of the Shannon. He has a number of bodhrán tutorials available at his YouTube channel. 
 Colm Ó Snodaigh joined the band in 1988, on the occasion of Kíla's first festival appearance, at the European Youth Music Festival, held in Bonn, Germany. He recorded his first solo album Éist in 1990; his follow-up, Giving (2007), was described by Hot Press as a work of "true beauty" and featured contributions from Hot House Flowers, Liam Ó Maonlaí and Fiachna Ó Braonáin, saxophonist Richie Buckley and Lisa Hannigan. Colm played soccer for League of Ireland team Bray Wanderers and was a sports columnist for the Irish-language weekly newspaper Anois. In 1995 his collection of short stories Turasóireacht was published by Coiscéim, his first novella, Pat the Pipe - Píobaire, was published in 2007 and in the same year his translation of Sandy Fitzgerald's children's story, Céal agus an Buachaill Gorm was also published. A collection of essays from his time as a columnist with online magazine Beo.ie Istigh sa cheol was published in book form, in 2013. He recently completed a book about civil disobedience in Corca Dhuibhne. It was published in 2017 and is called Dún Chaoin - Oscail an Scoil!.
 Dee Armstrong is a daughter of classical musicians Gillian and Lindsey Armstrong. She has illustrated a number of book covers, designed sets for plays and has worked with street theater company Macnas. Armstrong has recorded with other musical artists (Bobbie Lee, The Clay Dolls). She has designed and choreographed the Manorhamilton Halloween Parade for many years. She founded the feted Manorhamilton Summer Rock School. She most recently devised the Féile Kíla shows and also helped in the organising and devising of Palfest's alternative Eurovision!
 Seanán Brennan, a native of Ros Neamhlach, is a guitarist, bassist and mandola player, formerly a member of the groups Boxty and Georgia. 
 Brian Hogan followed his brother Lance into the band in 1996, having guest performed with Kíla in a tour of the southwest of Ireland in December 1993. Brian has toured and recorded with several bands, including the Eurostar Band. He has illustrated a number of books, including Rossa's Joy of Pissing, and has designed sleeves for CDs. His side project band Preachers Son released their first single "X for Sandra" in March 2010, followed by their début album Love, Life & Limb later that year. His video for his song ”Come On" won Best Music Video at LA Film and Script Festival. Brian and Lance are sons of folk singer Larry Hogan and artist Róisín Daly. His 2014 album is Ten Stories Tall.
 Dave Hingerty has toured and recorded with many bands, most notably Josh Ritter, The Frames, The Swell Season, Eric Eckhart and Gráda. He founded the Irish Drum Academy ten years ago, which continues to thrive in Temple Lane Studios. He is also a skilled photographer and has worked with the likes of Iggy Pop, The Beastie Boys and Kings of Leon. Along with studio engineer/producer Anthony Gibney Dave released a collaborative album in 2020 Side 4 Collective.
 James Mahon was a founding member of short-lived band Cirrus, and is a former member of the Afro Celt Sound System. He earned Masters in Music Performance in the University of Limerick.

Emeritus members 

 Colm Mac Con Iomaire was a founding member who left in 1991 to join Glen Hansard and The Frames. Following Glen and Marketa Irglova's success with the soundtrack to John Carney's film Once, Colm joined the touring band for the film music of The Swell Season. In 2008 he released his first solo album The Hare's Corner/Cúinne an Ghiorria to wide acclaim. His subsequent releases are Anois an Aimsir/And now the Weather (2015) and The River Holds its Breath - Tost ar an Abhann (2020).
 Ed Kelly moved to Scotland, having toured with the band for a number of years and having recorded Mind the Gap with the group. He is an active musician on the Scottish jazz circuit.
 Lance Hogan was born in Limerick in 1969 and grew up in Dún Laoghaire, Co. Dublin.  He is a music producer, composer and multi-instrumentalist. He has toured with Dead Can Dance and has worked with U2 and Oscar-winning director Neil Jordan.
 Eóin Dillon (piper). Originally a cabinet maker, he taught woodwork on Tory Island before embarking on an apprenticeship with pipe maker Cillian Ó Briain. He has released 3 solo albums, The Third Twin (2005), The Golden Mean (2010) & "Pondelorum" (2016) released shortly after his departure from the band. 
 Eóin O'Brien plays bass and guitar, and wrote the heavy metal song "Just Another Bloodletting Day" from the highly acclaimed album Straight in No Kissin. He is the author and illustrator of many books including Symbols of Ireland, Best Loved Irish Ballads & the very popular Flossie McFluff children's book series.
 Dave Odlum left the band to join The Frames and is now is a well known producer and runs the famous recording studio The Black Box in France. His production credits include Josh Ritter, Tinariwen and The Frames.
 Karl Odlum - the busiest man in Irish music! Producer of countless albums by countless bands and producer of Kila's albums -  Kíla & Oki, Gamblers' Ballet, Soisín and Suas Síos.
 David Reidy - leather jacket, swagger, sunglasses, fag-in-mouth, can-in-hand and fingers full of riffs, David played with Kíla from 1990 to 1992 before he moved to San Francisco, changed profession and has since thrived in law.
 Laurence O'Keefee - joined the band for tours of Ireland and Germany in 1995. He was a founding member of English psychedelic rock band Dark Star, that formed from the ashes of another cult band Levitation. He played bass guitar, dumbek and shakers with Kíla and his bass drones grace the album Tóg é go Bog é.
 Robbie Perry - joined the band for a tour of Ireland in 1995, but his time was curtailed by a shoulder injury suffered in a car accident. Always close to the band he acted as eyes, ears and heart for the album Lemonade & Buns and has played on some of Rónán's albums and Colm's too. He is now based in Cavan making some of the most amazing instruments ever seen and played. He is also playing with post-punk-apocalyptic band Thatchers of the Acropolis.

 Images 

 Discography 

 Studio albums 

 Groovin'   - 8-track cassette (1991)
 Handel's Fantasy (1993)
 Mind the Gap (1995)
 Tóg É Go Bog É (1997) – No. 55 Australia
 Lemonade & Buns (2000)
 Luna Park (2003)
 Kíla & Oki - with Oki (2006)
 Gamblers' Ballet (2007)
 Soisín (2010)
 Suas Síos (2014)

 Live albums 

 Live in Vicar St. (2000)
 Live in Dublin (2004)
 Kíla - Alive Beo (2017)

 Soundtrack albums 

 Monkey - soundtrack to West End pantomime (2002)
 The Secret of Kells - film soundtrack, with Bruno Coulais (2009)
 Song of the Sea - film soundtrack, with Bruno Coulais (2015)
 Wolfwalkers - film soundtrack, with Bruno Coulais (2021)
 Arracht - film soundtrack (2021)

 Compilation albums 

 Best of & Live in Dublin (double album) - Japan only (2005)
 Rogha - The Best Of (2009) - a 2-CD collection

 Remix albums 

 Another Beat - remixed Kíla tracks by Japanese artists - Japan only (2006)

 Singles as Kíla 

 "Ón Taobh Tuathail Amach" (1997)
 "Tóg é go Bog é" - live Christmas single (2002)
 "Glanfaidh Mé" - radio edit (2003)
 "An Tiománaí" - with Heatwave (2005)
 "Tóg é go Bog é" - with Oki (2005)
 "hAon Dó & Ní Liom Féin" - with Oki - radio edits (2006)
 "Half Eight/Leath ina dhiaidh a hOcht"  - radio edit (2007)
 "Cabhraigí Léi/Nothing Changes Around Here"  - remixes with The Thrills giveaway with Hot Press (2007)
 "The Ballad of Ronnie Drew" - with U2, The Dubliners & A Band of Bowsies (2008)
 "Cardinal Knowledge"  - radio edit (2009)
 "Cúrsaí Grá"  - radio single (2019)
 "Raise the Road" - featuring the Paul Frost Brass (2023)
 "Cara Liom" - featuring the Paul Frost Brass (2023)

 Solo albums 

 Éist - Colm Ó Snodaigh (1990)
 Tip Toe - Rónán Ó Snodaigh & Simon O'Reilly (2001)
 Tonnta Ró - Rónán Ó Snodaigh (2003)
 The Playdays - Rónán Ó Snodaigh (2004)
 The Third Twin - Eoin Dillon (2005)
 The Last Mile Home - Rónán Ó Snodaigh (2007)
 Giving - Colm Ó Snodaigh (2007)
 The Golden Mean - Eoin Dillon, Steve Larkin, Des Cahalan & Frank Tate (2010)
 Love, Life & Limb - Preachers Son (Brian Hogan) (2010)
 Water Off a Duck's Back - Rónán Ó Snodaigh (2011)
 Sos - Rónán Ó Snodaigh & The Occasionals (2013)
 10 Stories Tall - Preachers Son (Brian Hogan) (2014)
 Ór & Airgead - Rónán Ó Snodaigh & Mark Gavin (2017)
 Wild Journeys - Rónán Ó Snodaigh (2020) - soundtrack album - digital only 
 We Burn Bright - Side 4 Collective - Dave Hingerty (2020) - vinyl
 Aistir ar an Aibítir - Rossa Ó Snodaigh (2020) - digital only
 Tá Go Maith - Rónán Ó Snodaigh & Indistinct Chatter (aka Myles O'Reilly) (2021) - vinyl & digital

 DVDs as Kíla 

 Live in Vicar St - bonus DVD with Luna Park (2003)
 Kíla 'Once Upon a Time - concert film filmed in Vicar St Dublin (2008)
 Pota Óir - directed by Anthony White (2018)
 Cúl an Tí - 12 songs, 12 singers, 12 animators - in collaboration with Cartoon Saloon, Fócas Films and TG4 (2018)

 Books as Kíla 

 Leabhar Foinn - Kíla - Book of Tunes (melody notation book) - Kíla (2011)

 Books by Members of Kíla 

 Turasóireacht (short stories) - Colm Ó Snodaigh (1995)
 Luascadán (collection of Rónán's song lyrics in Irish) - Rónán Ó Snodaigh (2004)
 Songs (collection of Rónán's song lyrics in English) - Rónán Ó Snodaigh (2004)
 The Joy of Pissing (humorous insights into all things urine & urination) - Rossa Ó Snodaigh aka Professor Jimmy Riddle and illustrated by Brian Hogan (2006)
 Pat The Pipe - Píobaire (novella) - Colm Ó Snodaigh (2007)
 The Garden Wars (poetry) - Rónán Ó Snodaigh (2007)
 Céal & an Buachaill Gorm (children's story) - Sandy Fitzgerald - translated to Irish Colm Ó Snodaigh (2008)
 Cliúsaíocht as Gaeilge / Making Out in Irish (phrase book) - Rossa Ó Snodaigh (2010)
 Our Fada - Rossa Ó Snodaigh and Mícheál Ó Domhnaill (2012)
 Istigh sa Cheol - Colm Ó Snodaigh (2013)
 An Fochlac Foclach - Rossa Ó Snodaigh (2015)
 Dún Chaoin - Oscail an Scoil! - Colm Ó Snodaigh (2017)
 An File - Vivienne Baillie - translated to Irish Colm Ó Snodaigh (2019)
 Dearbhuithe Dearfacha - Tiarnán Ó Ruairc - translated to Irish Rossa Ó Snodaigh (2020)
 Aistir ar an Aibítir (children's book including music download) - Rossa Ó Snodaigh (2020)
 Grá i nGléas G (children's book including music download) - Rossa Ó Snodaigh (2021)
 Cad a Chuirfeadh Sceon ar Leon? (children's book including music download) - Rossa Ó Snodaigh (2022)
 Cnaipí agus scéalta eile (short stories) - Colm Ó Snodaigh (2022)
 When Peace Broke Out in the Garden'' (poem) - Rónán Ó Snodaigh (2022)

References

External links 
 Kila.ie, Kíla's official website
 IrishMusicDB information
 Musical Rooms Part 13; Kíla, by Sinéad Gleeson, February 18, 2008
 Ón Taobh tuathail Amach & The Dream I Haven't Showed Her, Rónán Ó Snodaigh performance on Other Voices RTÉ 2002
 Review of Kíla & Oki by Jamie Rowland, Pennyblackmusic, March 2007
 Review of Kíla at The Electric Picnic 2008 by Jan Ní fhlanagáin, Cluas.com, September 2008
 Excerpt of an article about Kíla by Donald Mahoney 2007
 Article by Nadine O Regan about Kíla & Oki in The Sunday Business Post, 13 August 2006
 Kíla concert review by Neil King  in September 2009
 Kíla concert preview by Roger levesque  in The Edmonton Journal in August 2011
 Kíla Book of Tunes review in Folkworld.de, March 2012

Cartoon Saloon people
Musical groups established in 1987
Musical groups from County Dublin
Irish folk musical groups
Celtic fusion groups
People educated at Coláiste Eoin
Celtic music groups